Nemanja Milunović (born 31 May 1989) is a Serbian professional footballer who plays as a centre back for Serbian club Red Star Belgrade and the Serbia national team.

Club career

Early career
Milunović made his professional debut with hometown club Borac Čačak, but saw little playing time. He was then loaned to Mladost Lučani for the 2010-11 season; at the time the team played in the Serbia's second tier. Mladost Lučani returned to the Serbian SuperLiga the following season, during which Milunović played a total of 30 games and scored a total of six goals. Eventually, Mladost Lučani purchased Milunović's contract from Borac Čačak. At Mladost Lučani, Milunović was coached by Neško Milovanović.

BATE Borisov
In 2015, Milunović joined Belarusian team BATE Borisov in a  €300,000 transfer from Mladost Lučani. He played in the team's 2015–16 UEFA Champions League campaign under coach Alyaksandr Yermakovich. On 16 September 2015, he scored BATE's only goal in their first Champions League match that season, a 4-1 loss against Bayer Leverkusen. Although BATE was last in their group by the end of the 2015 UEFA Champions League group stage, BATE's general secretary Andrei Vashkevich stated that Milunović was one of the team's most consistent players, even suggesting that he had a chance to be named the Vysheyshaya Liga's Player of the Year. Milunović was subsequently named in the ideal team of the Belarus's Vysheyshaya Liga for two consecutive seasons.

Red Star Belgrade
After Milunović decided not to renew his contract with BATE Borisov, he signed a 2.5-year contract with Red Star Belgrade as a free agent in the 2018–19 winter transfer window. He played in Red Star's 2019–20 UEFA Champions League campaign under coach Vladan Milojević.

Alanyaspor
In June 2021, after his contract with Red Star expired, Milunović signed 2-year contract with Turkish side Alanyaspor.

International career
Milunović made his first appearance for the Serbia national football team under coach Slavoljub Muslin in a 2-1 friendly win over Cyprus in November 2016.

Career statistics

Club

International statistics

International goals
Score and Result lists Serbia's goals first

Honours
Mladost Lučani
 Serbian First League: 2013–14

BATE Borisov
 Belarusian Premier League: 2015, 2016, 2017, 2018
 Belarusian Cup: 2014-15
 Belarusian Super Cup: 2015, 2016, 2017

Red Star Belgrade
 Serbian SuperLiga (3): 2018–19, 2019–20, 2020–21
 Serbian Cup: 2020–21

References

External links
 
 Nemanja Milunović Stats at utakmica.rs

1989 births
Living people
Sportspeople from Čačak
Serbian footballers
Association football defenders
Serbia international footballers
Serbian expatriate footballers
Expatriate footballers in Belarus
Expatriate footballers in Turkey
Serbian SuperLiga players
FK Borac Čačak players
FK Mladost Lučani players
FC BATE Borisov players
Red Star Belgrade footballers
Alanyaspor footballers